Sultan Abdullah II Sri suvama Abaarana Mahaa radun was the Sultan of the Maldives in 1377. He ruled the country for only 1 month.

14th-century sultans of the Maldives